What the Fuck Will Change? is the first studio album by A Global Threat. It was originally released in 2000 by Step 1 Records and was re-released on September 23, 2002, by Punk Core Records with two more tracks.

Track listing 

Tracks 1–8 are the original songs for the What the Fuck Will Change? CD EP on ADD Records.
Tracks 2, 8, and 9 were released as the songs on the split EP with The Broken on Controlled Conscience Records.
Tracks 10–13 are previously unreleased outtakes from the Until We Die studio sessions. Different versions of these appear on The Kids Will Revolt.
Tracks 14 and 15 appear only on the 2002 Punk Core release of the album. They were previously released on the split EP with The End on Anarchrist Records. A different version of "Who's to Blame?" appears on Until We Die.

Original track listing 
 "Religious Scam"
 "Idle Threats"
 "All We Really Own"
 "False Patriot"
 "Stop the Violence"
 "The Proles"
 "Live for Now"
 "The Power"
 "We're Not Gonna Take It" (Twisted Sister cover)

Line up for recording 
 Bryan – vocals
 Mark – vocals
 Pete – guitar
 Brett Threat – bass guitar (tracks 1–9)
 Gabe Astard – bass guitar (tracks 10–15)
 Mike – drums

Engineered by Dave Tarbox

References

A Global Threat albums
1999 albums